Mynydd Tarw is a subsidiary summit of Cadair Berwyn in north east Wales. It used to have a top: Rhos which has now been deleted as a Nuttall.

The summit has a large shelter cairn. The views are extensive, with the lower; northern and western Berwyns visible, including Pen Bwlch Llandrillo. Cadair Berwyn, Godor, Moel yr Ewig and Foel Wen are also in view.

References

External links
 www.geograph.co.uk : photos of Cadair Berwyn and surrounding area

Hewitts of Wales
Mountains and hills of Powys
Nuttalls
Mountains and hills of Denbighshire